Franz Georg Pressler (24 April 1927 – 29 March 1982), known by the stage name Fatty George was an Austrian jazz clarinettist.

References

1927 births
1982 deaths